Guinness World Records is an annual book first published in 1954.

Guinness World Records may also refer to:

 Guinness World Records Gamer's Edition, book first published in 2008 listing video gaming world records
 Guinness World Records: The Video Game, video game based on the book, published in November 2008
 Guinness World Records Primetime, TV show aired from July 1998 to October 2001
 Guinness World Records (TV series), TV show aired from March 2011